Waverly is a given name, a transferred use of a surname and place name that likely meant “meadow filled with quivering aspens”.  Modern parents might also associate the name with ocean waves because of the first syllable of the name.

Popularity
Variant spellings Waverlee, Waverleigh, Waverley, and Waverlie are also in use. It is in use for both sexes but has recently gained in usage for girls in the United States. Waverly has been among the one thousand most popular names for girls in the United States since 2018.

Notable people

 Waverly Alford III (born 1977), stage name King Gordy, a rapper from Detroit, Michigan
 Waverly Brown (1935–1981), American police officer killed in the line of duty
 Waverly D. Crenshaw Jr. (born 1956), a United States district judge
 Waverly Jackson (born 1972), American former National Football League player
 Waverly Person (1926-2022), American seismologist
 Waverly Jack Slattery (1904–1983), American politician, elected to the California Senate in 1958
 Waverly B. Woodson Jr. (1922–2005), American soldier and health professional

Fictional characters
 Waverly Earp, a female character from comic book and TV series Wynonna Earp
 Waverly Jong, a female character from The Joy Luck Club
 Waverly Boyle, one of the three rich Boyle sisters and ally to the antagonist of the 2012 French video game Dishonored.

See also
 Waverley Root (1903–1982), American journalist and writer

Notes

Masculine given names
English feminine given names
English masculine given names
English unisex given names
English-language unisex given names